Abajaluy, also rendered as Abajalu, may refer to:
 Abajaluy-e Olya
 Abajaluy-e Sofla